Mintiu Gherlii is a commune in Cluj County, Transylvania, Romania. It is composed of six villages: Bunești (Széplak), Mintiu Gherlii, Nima (Néma), Pădurenii (Coptelke), Petrești (Péterháza) and Salatiu (Szilágytő).

Demographics 
According to the census from 2002 there was a total population of 3,860 people living in this commune. Of this population, 95.51% are ethnic Romanians,  3.44% ethnic Romani and 1.03% are ethnic Hungarians.

Natives
Aurelia Szőke-Tudor

References

Atlasul localităților județului Cluj (Cluj County Localities Atlas), Suncart Publishing House, Cluj-Napoca, 

Communes in Cluj County
Localities in Transylvania